Mystery Disc is a compilation album by Frank Zappa. It was released on CD in 1998, compiling tracks that were originally released on two separate vinyl records and included in the mail order Old Masters box sets, which were released in three volumes between 1985 and 1987. (These box sets, issued on Barking Pumpkin, contained repressings of Zappa's albums from Freak Out! (1966) to Zoot Allures (1976), along with a 'Mystery Disc' in boxes one and two.) The CD omits the last two tracks from the 1985 LP, "Why Don'tcha Do Me Right?" and "Big Leg Emma", both of which were included on the CD version of Absolutely Free (1967) in 1989.

The recordings featured on Mystery Disc cover the early stages of Zappa's career, and were made between 1962 and 1969 (with the exception of "The Story of Willie the Pimp", a 1972 'field recording'). The material overlaps in places with that of You Can't Do That on Stage Anymore, Vol. 5 (1992), Ahead of Their Time (1993), The Lost Episodes (1996) and Finer Moments (2013). A number of the earlier tracks—"I Was a Teen-Age Malt Shop", "The Birth of Captain Beefheart" and "Metal Man Has Won His Wings", all likely recorded in 1964—feature Captain Beefheart on vocals. These are three light-hearted collaborations; "Metal Man Has Won His Wings" has Beefheart reading the lyrics directly from an advert for a comic book.

Track listing 
All tracks by Frank Zappa, except where noted.

The tracks were separated across the original 'mystery discs' thus:
 Mystery Disc #1: tracks 1–20, plus "Why Don'tcha Do Me Right?" and "Big Leg Emma"
 Mystery Disc #2: tracks 21–35

Overlaps with other albums 
 You Can't Do That on Stage Anymore, Vol. 5
 "Black Beauty" is an unedited version of "Underground Freak-Out Music"
  Ahead of Their Time: 
 "Original Mothers at Fillmore East" and "Lecture From Festival Hall Show": these tracks are from the same concert as the one of Ahead Of Their Time but are not included on the latter album.
 "Harry You're A Beast" is a shorter edit
 "Don Interrupts" is a different edit than "Progress" 
 "Piece One" is a different edit than "Like It Or Not" 
 "Jim/Roy" is a different edit than the same material on the tracks "The Jimmy Carl Black Philosophy Lesson", "Holding The Group Back" and "Holiday In Berlin" 
 "Piece Two" is a shorter edit of "The Rejected Mexican Pope Leaves The Stage" and "Undaunted, The Band Plays On"
 "Agency Man" is a shorted edit
 The Lost Episodes
 "Run Home Slow" is in mono and probably a different take
 "Charva" is the stereo mix version
 "Wedding Dress Song / Handsome Cabin Boy" is the same recording as the separate tracks on The Lost Episodes
 Finer Moments: see album page for more information

References

External links 
 Lyrics and information
 Release details:
 as Mystery Disc
 as part of The Old Masters box sets

Compilation albums published posthumously
Frank Zappa compilation albums
1998 compilation albums
Rykodisc compilation albums